Richard Henry Holton (1926-2005) was an American economist and  the E. T. Grether Professor of Marketing, Emeritus at the University of California, Berkeley. He was the eighth dean of Haas School of Business.

Books
 The Canadian Economy: Prospect and Retrospect" (1959)
 Marketing Efficiency in Puerto Rico, John Kenneth Galbraith, Richard Henry Holton, Robert E. Branson, Jean Ruth Robinson, Carolyn Shaw Bell, Harvard University Press
 United States-China Relations, University of California Press, 1989

References

1926 births
2005 deaths
20th-century American economists
University of California, Berkeley faculty
Harvard University alumni